Stories We Could Tell is a country rock album by The Everly Brothers, released in 1972. It was reissued as Stories We Could Tell:The RCA Years by BMG in 2003 and included additional tracks, all stemming from the successor album Pass the Chicken & Listen. In 2014 it was re-released once more on Stories We Could Tell + Pass The Chicken & Listen by Morello Records.

Track listing 
Side 1
"All We Really Want to Do" (Bonnie Bramlett, Delaney Bramlett) – 2:22
"Breakdown" (Kris Kristofferson) – 3:12
"Green River" (Don Everly, Phil Everly) – 4:42
"Mandolin Wind" (Rod Stewart) – 3:01
"Up in Mabel's Room" (Phil Everly, Terry Slater) – 3:15
"Del Rio Dan" (Jeff Kent, Doug Lubahn, Holly Beckwith) – 3:57
Side 2
"Ridin' High" (Dennis Linde) – 2:41
"Christmas Eve Can Kill You (When You're Trying to Hitch a Ride to Anywhere)" (Dennis Linde) – 3:26
"Three Armed, Poker-Playin' River Rat" (Dennis Linde) – 2:46
"I'm Tired of Singing My Song in Las Vegas" (Don Everly) – 3:14
"The Brand New Tennessee Waltz" (Jesse Winchester) – 3:11
"Stories We Could Tell" (John Sebastian) – 3:19

Personnel
 Don Everly – guitar, vocals
 Phil Everly – guitar, vocals
 Delaney Bramlett – guitar, vocals
 Bonnie Bramlett - vocals
 Jeff Kent – guitar, vocals
 Dennis Linde – guitar, keyboards
 Geoff Muldaur – guitar
 Wayne Perkins – guitar
 John Sebastian – guitar, harmonica, vocals
 Waddy Wachtel – guitar
 Danny Weis – guitar
 Clarence White – guitar
 Ry Cooder – electric bottleneck guitar on "Green River" and "Del Rio Dan"
 Buddy Emmons – slide guitar
 Jerry McGee – slide guitar
 Barry Beckett – keyboards
 Michael Fonfara – keyboards 
 Spooner Oldham – keyboards
 Warren Zevon – keyboards
 Johnny Barbata – drums
 Jim Gordon – drums
 Russ Kunkel – drums
 George Bohanon – brass
 Tommy Johnson – brass
 Chris Ethridge – bass
 Jimmie Haskell – string arrangement
 David Crosby – vocals
 Doug Lubahn – vocals
 Graham Nash – vocals
Technical
 Norman Seeff - photography

References

External links
"Stories We Could Tell" album and tour info

1972 albums
The Everly Brothers albums
Albums arranged by Jimmie Haskell
Albums produced by Paul A. Rothchild
RCA Records albums